Brigita is predominantly a Lithuanian and Slovenian feminine given name. Individuals bearing the name Brigita include:
Brigita Brezovac (born 1979), Slovenian bodybuilder
Brigita Bukovec (born 1970), Slovenian hurdler 
Brigita Ivanauskaitė (born  1993), Lithuanian handball player
Brigita Langerholc (born 1976), Slovenian middle distance runner
Brigita Schmögnerová (born 1947), Slovak economist and politician
Brigita Virbalytė-Dimšienė (born 1985), Lithuanian race walker
Brigita Vuco (born 1999), Croatian singer-songwriter

References 

Feminine given names
Lithuanian feminine given names
Slovene feminine given names